Maurice Guest may refer to:

 Morris Gest (1875–1942), also Maurice Guest, American theatrical producer
 Maurice Guest (novel), a novel by Henry Handel Richardson